CSI Holy Trinity Church in Yercaud, Tamil Nadu, India was built in 1834 and was rebuilt in 1853 after a damaging accident. It belongs to the Church of South India Trust Association.

The church is the resting place of Robert Bruce Foote, (1834–1912), the British archaeologist and geologist who is considered the "Father of Indian Prehistory". A memorial to him may be found there. The churchyard also has the grave of Peter Percival (1803–1882). He was a  missionary, linguist and a pioneering educator in Sri Lanka and South India.

References

Churches completed in 1834
Anglican church buildings in India
Churches in Tamil Nadu